The Wisconsin State Fair is an annual event held at the Wisconsin State Fair Park in West Allis, Wisconsin, a suburb of Milwaukee. The modern fair takes place in August (occasionally beginning late July) and lasts 11 days.

History
The first Wisconsin State Fair was held in 1851 in Janesville, with approximately 13,000 to 18,000 people in attendance. Sponsored by the state’s Agricultural Society, it was held on a six-acre plot along the banks of the Rock River. It featured a 200-pound squash and a quarter-acre plowing competition with teams of horses and oxen. It was reportedly the largest gathering in Wisconsin history.

When the second fair was held in Milwaukee in 1852, fairgoers took their carriages for rides around the Cold Spring Race Course.

Abraham Lincoln was invited to give the annual oration at the fair in 1859. He spoke on the principles of free labor - farmers and their families working for themselves without the use of hired labor - and of the interconnectedness of farmers, merchants, and other businesses. He advised farmers to embrace new methods of agriculture, with the goal of raising the standard of living.

The fair added new attractions each year, and in 1869, there was a fire engine demonstration where boxes, barrels and a large wooden building were set aflame. For decades, the fair moved from city to city, including Janesville, Watertown, Fond du Lac, Madison and Milwaukee, until 1892, when it was first held at its permanent and present location at Wisconsin State Fair Park.

During the 2011 fair, a small but violent flash mob was formed and began attacking fairgoers, with some witnesses stating that the attacks were racially-motivated. Eighteen people, including seven police officers, were injured during the event. In response, fair managers added a youth curfew and worked with civic and youth leaders to prevent a recurrence.

On May 28, 2020, the state fair's board of directors announced the cancellation of the 2020 State Fair, due to the state's COVID-19 pandemic. Previous Fairs had been cancelled in 1917 and 1918, then 1942 through 1945, all due to World Wars I and II.

The Milwaukee Mile 
The Milwaukee Mile is a one-mile paved oval racing circuit on the grounds of the State Fair. It is the oldest continuously-operated motor racing circuit in the world. Racing or exhibition events are often held on the circuit in conjunction with the state fair.

Events and entertainment 

Yearly features at the fair include a wide variety of vendors, many local and national bands, the Kids From Wisconsin, and a large assortment of food and drink, including cream puffs, which are one of the fair's most popular attractions.  In 2010, the Wisconsin State Fair introduced Comet 2, a forty-foot roller coaster.  New in 2012, the Wisconsin State Fair took over the Midway, creating Spin City, a collection of independently contracted rides including the Sizzler, the Freak Out, and the Stratosphere, a 200-foot-tall swing ride.

The Main Stage features headline performance every evening of the fair.  Many local bands can also be seen on smaller stages and pavilions located throughout the grounds.

Agricultural exhibits of horses, cattle, sheep, chickens and other animals are featured every year at the fair.

The Wisconsin State Fair is also home of the Wisconsin Wine Garden.  Established in 1996 by the then ten member-wineries of the Wisconsin Winery Association, the Wine Garden features wines from dozens of Wisconsin wineries.

Fairgoer demographics
Average age of a fairgoer: 40
84% of fairgoers reside in Wisconsin – half of them live in metropolitan Milwaukee 
Average visits to the fair: 3 times 
Average hours spent at the fair: 5 – 7 hours

Attendance
Attendance: 1,130,572 in 2019

See also
Northern Wisconsin State Fair
Central Wisconsin State Fair

References

Further reading 
 Crump, Gordon. "Baits Trap with Cheese: State Products Sell Fair", The Billboard, November 29, 1947, p. 30.
 Economics Research Associates. Economic Impact of the Wisconsin State Fair and Non-Fair Events, 1979. West Allis, WI: Wisconsin State Fair Park, 1980.
 Gordon, Julie. State Fair Park: An Evaluation. Madison, WI: Wisconsin Legislative Audit Bureau, 2003.
 Kapler, Joe. "Preserving the 'Big Picture' for Wisconsin: The 1948 Centennial Fair Murals". Wisconsin Magazine of History, vol. 95, no. 1 (Autumn 2011): 26-35.
 Lathrop, John H. "Address Delivered at the First Annual Fair of the State Agricultural Society, Held at Janesville, Wisconsin: October 2, 1851". Milwaukee: Daily Sentinel Print, 1851.
 Lincoln, Abraham. Lincoln on Agriculture: Address, Wisconsin State Agricultural Society, State Fair, Milwaukee, September 30, 1859. Madison: Lincoln Fellowship of Wisconsin, 1943.
 Ryan, John W. The Wisconsin State Fair: Its Modern Role and Objectives. A Report to Wisconsin Department of Agriculture. Madison: University Extension Division, 1960.
 State Fair Commemorative Cookbook: Featuring 150 Award-Winning Recipes. West Allis, WI: Wisconsin State Fair, 2001.
 Wisconsin State Fair: 1979 Visitor Study. Madison, WI: University of Wisconsin-Extension, 1980.
 Wisconsin State Fair Park Public Relations Department. Wisconsin State Fair: A Brief History of the Wisconsin State Fair. West Allis, WI: Wisconsin State Fair Park, 1990.
 Zimmerman, Jerry. 150 Years of the Wisconsin State Fair: An Illustrated History, 1851-2001. West Allis, WI: Wisconsin State Fair Park, 2001.

External links

 Wisconsin State Fair Park website
 Wisconsin State Fair Park Foundation Website
 1948 Wisconsin State Fair Murals

 
West Allis, Wisconsin
State fairs
Wisconsin culture
Tourism in Wisconsin
Tourist attractions in Milwaukee County, Wisconsin
Traveling carnivals
Festivals established in 1851